Mitchell Young (born July 18, 1961) is a former American football defensive end who played one season with the Atlanta Falcons of the National Football League. He first enrolled at Northwest Mississippi Community College before transferring to Arkansas State. He attended North Panola High School in Sardis, Mississippi. Young was also a member of the Ottawa Rough Riders, Denver Dynamite and Sacramento Attack.

References

External links
Just Sports Stats

Living people
1961 births
Players of American football from Mississippi
American football defensive ends
Canadian football defensive linemen
African-American players of American football
African-American players of Canadian football
Northwest Mississippi Rangers football players
Arkansas State Red Wolves football players
Atlanta Falcons players
Ottawa Rough Riders players
Denver Dynamite (arena football) players
Sacramento Attack players
People from Coldwater, Mississippi
21st-century African-American people
20th-century African-American sportspeople